GOAT is an American online platform offering sneakers, luxury apparel and accessories through primary and resale markets. Founded in 2015, GOAT has 30 million members and 600,000 sellers across 170 countries on its platform.

History
GOAT was founded by Eddy Lu and Daishin Sugano in July 2015. Lu serves as the Chief Executive Officer and co-founder, while Sugano holds the role of Chief Product Officer and co-founder. Yunah Lee was appointed Chief Financial Officer in 2017, Sen Sugano was appointed Chief Brand Officer in 2019 and Matt Cohen was appointed Chief Revenue Officer in 2021.

GOAT implements a “ship-to-verify” model that uses machine learning to verify the authenticity of the sneakers on its platform. In 2019, the platform expanded into new markets and categories to offer luxury and streetwear apparel and accessories in addition to secondhand products.

GOAT has partnered with several luxury brands, including Versace, Chloe, and Bergdorf Goodman.

In February 2018, GOAT and Flight Club announced their merger, creating an omni-channel approach for the business. The brands operate independently, as GOAT focuses on mobile and web listings, while Flight Club focuses on global retail and e-commerce consignment. In February 2019, Foot Locker invested $100 million into GOAT Group, combining their efforts across their digital and physical retail platforms. In July 2019, GOAT launched in China.

In September 2020, GOAT raised $100 million from D1 Capital Partners to double its market value to nearly $2 billion. GOAT increased its market value to $3.75 billion over the following nine months, raising $195 million led by Park West Asset Management.

References 

American companies established in 2015
2015 establishments in the United States
Sneaker culture